Redistributors is a 2015 film directed by Adrian Tanner, starring Alexandra Evans and Robert Boulton, with supporting performances from Alastair McKenzie, Jeff Rawle, Tim Bentinck, and James Allen.

The film was nominated for Best Thriller at the 2016 UK National Film Awards, while Alexandra Evans was the winner of the Best Supporting Actress category.

References

External links
 Official website
 
 Redistributors trailer 

British independent films
British action thriller films
2010s English-language films